Mississauga—Brampton South was a federal electoral district in Ontario, Canada, that was represented in the House of Commons of Canada from 2004 to 2015.

It consists of the parts of the cities of Mississauga and Brampton bounded by a line drawn from the intersection of Highway 401 with the northeastern limit of the City of Mississauga, south along the city limit, southwest along Burnhamthorpe Road East, northwest along Central Parkway East, southwest along Highway 403, northwest along Mavis Road; thence northwesterly along said road to Eglinton Avenue West; thence southwesterly along said avenue to Terry Fox Way; thence northwesterly along said way to Britannia Road West; thence northeasterly along said road to Mavis Road, southwest along Highway 401, northwest along Mississauga Road, northeast along the northwestern limit of the City of Mississauga, northwest along McLaughlin Road, northeast along Steeles Avenue East, southeast along Kennedy Road South, northeast along the northwestern limit of the City of Mississauga, southeast along Dixie Road, and northeast along Highway 401 to the point of commencement.

Following the 2012 federal electoral boundaries redistribution, the bulk of the district will be part of the new Mississauga—Malton district, with other parts transferred to Mississauga East—Cooksville, Mississauga Centre, Mississauga—Streetsville, Brampton South, and Brampton Centre.

History

It was created in 2003 from Bramalea—Gore—Malton—Springdale, Brampton West—Mississauga, Mississauga Centre and Mississauga East ridings.

Members of Parliament

This riding has elected the following member of the House of Commons of Canada:

Election results

Proposed Redistribution of Electoral Districts

There is a proposal to change the electoral districts. If the proposal is adopted, the southern Burnhamthorpe boundary would change to Eglinton. This would mean that Rockwood Village would move from Mississauga—Brampton South to the Mississauga East—Cooksville Riding.

See also
 List of Canadian federal electoral districts
 Past Canadian electoral districts

References

External links

Riding history from the Library of Parliament
 2011 Results from Elections Canada
 Campaign expense data from Elections Canada
Mississauga News Article on Proposed Electoral Districts August 28, 2012
Electoral Districts - Mississauga–Brampton South – Existing Boundaries
Electoral Districts - Mississauga Centre – Proposed Boundaries
Electoral Districts - Mississauga East-Cooksville – Existing Boundaries
Electoral Districts - Mississauga East-Cooksville – Proposed Boundaries

Former federal electoral districts of Ontario
Politics of Brampton
Politics of Mississauga